Željko Fajfrić (born February 24, 1957) is a Serbian professor of law and author on history. A lawyer by profession, he has two doctoral thesis on law, and works in his town of birth. Fajfrić was born in 1957 in Šid, SR Serbia, Yugoslavia (now Serbia), where he finished primary school and gymnasium. He graduated from the Faculty of Law in Novi Sad in 1979. He has a magister's degree in Law from the University of Novi Sad. In 1994 he finished a doctoral thesis in the Faculty of Law in Kragujevac.  He is the deputy of the President of the Assembly of Šid, Branislav Mauković.

Works

; 2008

References

External links
worldcat, author results
Serbian lawyers, profile

1957 births
Living people
20th-century Serbian historians
20th-century Serbian lawyers
Serbian legal scholars
Serbian politicians
People from Šid
University of Novi Sad alumni
21st-century Serbian historians
Serbian medievalists